Electric Chair is a compilation album by Australian rock group Hoodoo Gurus. It was originally released as a 2-CD set with Armchair Gurus in October 1997. The album features seventeen Hoodoo Gurus' rock/party tracks while Armchair Gurus contains seventeen ballads and slower songs. The album peaked at number 33 on the ARIA charts and was certified gold.

Track listing

 "The Real Deal" - 4:44
 "God-Fearing Family Man" - 4:54
 "Quicksand" - 3:32
 "Down on Me" - 3:24
 "Be My Guru" - 2:38
 "Death Ship" - 2:35
 "Hypocrite Blues" - 3:00
 "Glamourpuss" - 2:35
 "Where's the Action" - 3:40
 "Brainscan" - 3:19
 "I Think You Know" - 3:32
 "I Was a Kamikaze Pilot" - 3:09
 "Axegrinder" - 3:24
 "Gene Hackman" - 2:26
 "A Hard Day's Night" - 2:31
 "The Right Time" - 3:53
 "Form a Circle" / "She" - 7:48

Personnel 
Credited to:
 Alan Thorne - engineer (tracks: "Be My Guru", "Death Ship", "Glamourpuss", "I Think You Know", "I Was A Kamikaze Pilot", "Axegrinder")
 John Bee - engineer (tracks: "Form A Circle")
 Paul Hamingson - engineer (tracks: "Hypocrite Blues", "Brainscan", "The Right Time")
 Paul McKercher - engineer (tracks: "The Real Deal", "God-Fearing Family Man", "Quicksand", "Down On Me")
 Howie Weinberg - mastering
 David Thoener - mixer (tracks: "Glamourpuss", "Axegrinder")
 Kevin Shirley - mixer (tracks: "The Real Deal", "God-Fearing Family Man", "Quicksand", "Down On Me")
 Dave Collins (tracks: "Hypocrite Blues", "The Right Time", "Form A Circle")
 Adrienne Overall - photography
 Alan Thorne - producer (tracks: "Be My Guru", "Death Ship", "I Was A Kamikaze Pilot")
 Charles Fisher - producer (tracks: "Quicksand", "Down On Me", "Form A Circle")
 Ed Stasium - producer (tracks: "Hypocrite Blues", "The Right Time")
 Hoodoo Gurus (tracks: "The Real Deal", "God-Fearing Family Man", "Quicksand", "Down On Me", "Glamourpuss", "Where's The Action", "Brainscan", "I Think You Know", "Axegrinder", Gene Hackman")

Charts

Certifications

References

Hoodoo Gurus albums
Compilation albums by Australian artists
1997 compilation albums